How to Sleep is a short comedy film written by and starring humorist Robert Benchley. Filmed and released by MGM in 1935 (as part of their "Miniatures" series), it features Benchley as a narrator as well as film subject, discussing four parts of sleep - causes, methods, avoiding sleep, and waking up.

The production was inspired by a Mellon Institute study on sleep commissioned by the Simmons Mattress Company. It was filmed in two days, and featured Benchley as both the narrator and sleeper, the latter a role Benchley claimed was "not much of a strain, as [he] was in bed most of the time." The film was well received in preview screenings, and promotions took over, with a still from the film being used in Simmons advertisements. The only group not pleased was the Mellon Institute, who did not approve of the studio mocking their study.

The early success of How to Sleep prompted MGM to rush two more short films featuring Benchley, How to Train a Dog, a spoof of dog-training techniques, and How to Behave, which lampooned etiquette norms. How to Sleep was named Best Short Subject at the 8th Academy Awards in 1935, while the latter two shorts were not as well received.

The film is included as an extra on the DVD of the 1935 Marx Brothers feature film, A Night at the Opera, and is also available on the DVD set The Robert Benchley Miniatures Collection.

See also
 List of American films of 1935

References

Notes
 Billy Altman, Laughter's Gentle Soul: The Life of Robert Benchley. (New York City: W. W. Norton, 1997. ).
 Nathaniel Benchley, Robert Benchley, a biography. (New York City, McGraw-Hill, 1955).

External links

1935 films
Metro-Goldwyn-Mayer short films
1935 comedy films
1930s English-language films
American black-and-white films
Live Action Short Film Academy Award winners
Films directed by Nick Grinde
1935 short films
American comedy short films
1930s American films